The Boltzmann equation or Boltzmann transport equation (BTE) describes the statistical behaviour of a thermodynamic system not in a state of equilibrium, devised by Ludwig Boltzmann in 1872.
The classic example of such a system is a fluid with temperature gradients in space causing heat to flow from hotter regions to colder ones, by the random but biased transport of the particles making up that fluid. In the modern literature the term Boltzmann equation is often used in a more general sense, referring to any kinetic equation that describes the change of a macroscopic quantity in a thermodynamic system, such as energy, charge or particle number.

The equation arises not by analyzing the individual positions and momenta of each particle in the fluid but rather by considering a probability distribution for the position and momentum of a typical particle—that is, the probability that the particle occupies a given very small region of space (mathematically the volume element ) centered at the position , and has momentum nearly equal to a given momentum vector  (thus occupying a very small region of momentum space ), at an instant of time.

The Boltzmann equation can be used to determine how physical quantities change, such as heat energy and momentum, when a fluid is in transport. One may also derive other properties characteristic to fluids such as viscosity, thermal conductivity, and electrical conductivity (by treating the charge carriers in a material as a gas). See also convection–diffusion equation.

The equation is a nonlinear integro-differential equation, and the unknown function in the equation is a probability density function in six-dimensional space of a particle position and momentum. The problem of existence and uniqueness of solutions is still not fully resolved, but some recent results are quite promising.

Overview

The phase space and density function
The small volume ("differential volume element") is written 

Since the probability of  molecules, which all have  and  within , is in question, at the heart of the equation is a quantity  which gives this probability per unit phase-space volume, or probability per unit length cubed per unit momentum cubed, at an instant of time . This is a probability density function: , defined so that,

Integrating over a region of position space and momentum space gives the total number of particles which have positions and momenta in that region:

which is a 6-fold integral.

It is assumed the particles in the system are identical (so each has an identical mass ). For a mixture of more than one chemical species, one distribution is needed for each, see below.

Principal statement

The general equation can then be written as

where the "force" term corresponds to the forces exerted on the particles by an external influence (not by the particles themselves), the "diff" term represents the diffusion of particles, and "coll" is the collision term – accounting for the forces acting between particles in collisions. Expressions for each term on the right side are provided below.

The force and diffusion terms

Suppose at time  some number of particles all have position  within element  and momentum  within . If a force  instantly acts on each particle, then at time  their position will be  and momentum . Then, in the absence of collisions,  must satisfy

Note that we have used the fact that the phase space volume element  is constant, which can be shown using Hamilton's equations (see the discussion under Liouville's theorem). However, since collisions do occur, the particle density in the phase-space volume  changes, so

where  is the gradient operator,  is the dot product,

Final statement

The term on the right hand side is added to describe the effect of collisions between particles; if it is zero then the particles do not collide. The collisionless Boltzmann equation, where individual collisions are replaced with long-range aggregated interactions, e.g. Coulomb interactions, is often called the Vlasov equation.

This term cannot be found as easily or generally as the others – it is a statistical term representing the particle collisions, and requires knowledge of the statistics the particles obey, like the Maxwell–Boltzmann, Fermi–Dirac or Bose–Einstein distributions.

The collision term (Stosszahlansatz) and molecular chaos

Two-body collision term 
A key insight applied by Boltzmann was to determine the collision term resulting solely from two-body collisions between particles that are assumed to be uncorrelated prior to the collision. This assumption was referred to by Boltzmann as the "" and is also known as the "molecular chaos assumption". Under this assumption the collision term can be written as a momentum-space integral over the product of one-particle distribution functions:

Simplifications to the collision term 
Since much of the challenge in solving the Boltzmann equation originates with the complex collision term, attempts have been made to "model" and simplify the collision term.  The best known model equation is due to Bhatnagar, Gross and Krook.  The assumption in the BGK approximation is that the effect of molecular collisions is to force a non-equilibrium distribution function at a point in physical space back to a Maxwellian equilibrium distribution function and that the rate at which this occurs is proportional to the molecular collision frequency.  The Boltzmann equation is therefore modified to the BGK form:

General equation (for a mixture)

For a mixture of chemical species labelled by indices  the equation for species  is

where , and the collision term is

where , the magnitude of the relative momenta is

The integration is over the momentum components in the integrand (which are labelled i and j). The sum of integrals describes the entry and exit of particles of species i in or out of the phase-space element.

Applications and extensions

Conservation equations

The Boltzmann equation can be used to derive the fluid dynamic conservation laws for mass, charge, momentum, and energy. For a fluid consisting of only one kind of particle, the number density  is given by

The average value of any function  is

Since the conservation equations involve tensors, the Einstein summation convention will be used where repeated indices in a product indicate summation over those indices. Define  as some function of momentum  only, which is conserved in a collision. Multiplying the Boltzmann equation by A and integrating over momentum yields four terms, which, using integration by parts, can be expressed as

where the last term is zero, since  is conserved in a collision. The values of  correspond to moments of velocity  (and momentum , as they are linearly dependent).

Zeroth moment

Letting , the mass of the particle, the integrated Boltzmann equation becomes the conservation of mass equation:

First moment

Letting , the momentum of the particle, the integrated Boltzmann equation becomes the conservation of momentum equation:

where  is the pressure tensor (the viscous stress tensor plus the hydrostatic pressure).

Second moment

Letting , the kinetic energy of the particle, the integrated Boltzmann equation becomes the conservation of energy equation:

Hamiltonian mechanics

In Hamiltonian mechanics, the Boltzmann equation is often written more generally as

Quantum theory and violation of particle number conservation 

It is possible to write down relativistic quantum Boltzmann equations for relativistic quantum systems in which the number of particles is not conserved in collisions. This has several applications in physical cosmology, including the formation of the light elements in Big Bang nucleosynthesis, the production of dark matter and baryogenesis. It is not a priori clear that the state of a quantum system can be characterized by a classical phase space density f. However, for a wide class of applications a well-defined generalization of f exists which is the solution of an effective Boltzmann equation that can be derived from first principles of quantum field theory.

General relativity and astronomy

The Boltzmann equation is of use in galactic dynamics. A galaxy, under certain assumptions, may be approximated as a continuous fluid; its mass distribution is then represented by f; in galaxies, physical collisions between the stars are very rare, and the effect of gravitational collisions can be neglected for times far longer than the age of the universe.

Its generalization in general relativity. is

where  is the Christoffel symbol of the second kind (this assumes there are no external forces, so that particles move along geodesics in the absence of collisions), with the important subtlety that the density is a function in mixed contravariant-covariant  phase space as opposed to fully contravariant  phase space.

In physical cosmology the fully covariant approach has been used to study the cosmic microwave background radiation. More generically the study of processes in the early universe often attempt to take into account the effects of quantum mechanics and general relativity. In the very dense medium formed by the primordial plasma after the Big Bang, particles are continuously created and annihilated. In such an environment quantum coherence and the spatial extension of the wavefunction can affect the dynamics, making it questionable whether the classical phase space distribution f that appears in the Boltzmann equation is suitable to describe the system. In many cases it is, however, possible to derive an effective Boltzmann equation for a generalized distribution function from first principles of quantum field theory. This includes the formation of the light elements in Big Bang nucleosynthesis, the production of dark matter and baryogenesis.

Solving the equation 
Exact solutions to the Boltzmann equations have been proven to exist in some cases; this analytical approach provides insight, but is not generally usable in practical problems.

Instead, numerical methods (including finite elements and lattice Boltzmann methods) are generally used to find approximate solutions to the various forms of the Boltzmann equation. Example applications range from hypersonic aerodynamics in rarefied gas flows to plasma flows. An application of the Boltzmann equation in electrodynamics is the calculation of the electrical conductivity - the result is in leading order identical with the semiclassical result.

Close to local equilibrium, solution of the Boltzmann equation can be represented by an asymptotic expansion in powers of Knudsen number (the Chapman–Enskog expansion). The first two terms of this expansion give the Euler equations and the Navier–Stokes equations. The higher terms have singularities. The problem of developing mathematically the limiting processes, which lead from the atomistic view (represented by Boltzmann's equation) to the laws of motion of continua, is an important part of Hilbert's sixth problem.

Limitations and further uses of the Boltzmann equation 
The Boltzmann equation is valid only under several assumptions. For instance, the particles are assumed to be pointlike, i.e. without having a finite size. There exist a generalization of the Boltzmann equation that is called the Enskog equation. The collision term is modified in Enskog equations such that finite size of particles, for example particles can be a sphere having a fixed radius.

No further degree of freedoms besides translational motion are assumed for the particles. If there are internal degree of freedom, the Boltzmann equation has to be generalized and might possess inelastic collisions.

Many real fluids like liquids or dense gases have besides the features mentioned above more complex forms of collisions, there will be not only binary, but also ternary and higher order collisions. These must be derived by using BBGKY hierarchy.

Boltzmann-like equations are also used for the movement of cells. Since cells are composite particles that carry internal degree of freedom, the corresponding generalized Boltzmann equations must have inelastic collision integrals. Such equations can describe invasions of cancer cells in tissue, morphogenesis, and chemotaxis-related effects.

See also

 Vlasov equation
 The Vlasov–Poisson equation
 Fokker–Planck equation
 Williams–Boltzmann equation
 Derivation of Navier–Stokes equation from LBE 
 Derivation of Jeans equation from BE
 Jeans's theorem
 H-theorem

Notes

References
 . Very inexpensive introduction to the modern framework (starting from a formal deduction from Liouville and the Bogoliubov–Born–Green–Kirkwood–Yvon hierarchy (BBGKY) in which the Boltzmann equation is placed). Most statistical mechanics textbooks like Huang still treat the topic using Boltzmann's original arguments. To derive the equation, these books use a heuristic explanation that does not bring out the range of validity and the characteristic assumptions that distinguish Boltzmann's from other transport equations like Fokker–Planck or Landau equations.

External links
 The Boltzmann Transport Equation by Franz Vesely
 Boltzmann gaseous behaviors solved

Partial differential equations
Statistical mechanics
Transport phenomena
Equations of physics
Equation
1872 in science
1872 in Germany
Thermodynamic equations